HMAS Lusair is a former Royal Australian Navy (RAN) base located at Torokina, on Bougainville Island, Papua New Guinea.

See also

List of former Royal Australian Navy bases

References

External links

Lusair
Papua New Guinea